Hope Mill on Pollard Street, in the district of Ancoats, Manchester, England, is a cotton mill dating from 1824. A steam-driven mill, its engines were constructed by the Birmingham firm of Boulton and Watt. Derelict by the mid-20th century, the building was redeveloped in 2001 and now houses a range of creative industries, including the Hope Mill Theatre. Hope Mill is a Grade II* listed building.

History and description
By the early 19th century Manchester had become one of the world's great textile-producing cities. Its population rose from 75,000 in 1801, to over 300,000 fifty years later. The inner-city area of Ancoats became the main centre for factories and mills; largely open fields in the 1780s, "it became one of the most intensely developed industrial centres in the world." The Prussian court architect, Karl Friedrich Schinkel, visiting in 1824, wrote, "since the war 400 large new factories for cotton spinning have been built, several of them the size of the Royal Palace in Berlin." Hope Mill was built in 1824 for Joseph Clarke & Sons, textile spinners and fustian weavers. A steam-driven mill, its engines were supplied by Boulton and Watt.

By the mid-20th century, the building was derelict. In 2001 it was bought and refurbished by a private partnership and now houses a range of creative industries, including the Hope Mill Theatre.

The seven-storey building is constructed from red brick and to a rectangular plan. Hope Mill is a Grade II* listed building.

References

Sources

Textile mills in Manchester
Cotton industry in England
Former textile mills in the United Kingdom
1824 establishments in England
Grade II* listed industrial buildings
Grade II* listed buildings in Manchester